Pythia is the stage name of Christos Darlasis (born October 4, 1994), a Greek-Canadian drag performer most known for competing on the second season of Canada's Drag Race.

Early life and education
Pythia was raised in Argos, Greece, and moved to Montreal, Quebec at the age of 14. She earned a certificate in set and costume design.

She is a Greek national and applied for Canadian citizenship in 2020, and she obtained it in May 2022.

Career
Pythia is a Montreal-based drag performer who also works as a costume designer and makeup artist for film and theatre. She initially began performing in drag under the name Crystal Nebula, before renaming herself Pythia, for the mythological Oracle of Delphi, as a reference to her Greek heritage.

She was a finalist on the second season of Canada's Drag Race, reaching the Top 3 but ultimately losing the crown to Icesis Couture. She portrayed Grimes during the Snatch Game episode, and won the "Under the Big Top" Rusical and the makeover challenge. According to Anna Wichmann of the Greek Reporter, Pythia is "the first performer of Greek heritage to be featured on any of the show’s multinational franchises".

She has indicated that her goals in drag revolve around visual and theatrical storytelling. During the season, she received praise for several runway looks, including a two-headed fortune-teller in the "Circus Berzerkus" runway, a centaur in the Dungeons and Drag Queens runway and a Greek goddess statue in the finale, which were hailed as some of the most striking and original drag looks ever seen across the entire franchise.

Filmography

Television
 Canada's Drag Race (season 2, 2021) - Runner-up

References

External links
 
 

1994 births
Living people
21st-century Canadian LGBT people
Artists from Montreal
Canada's Drag Race contestants
Canadian costume designers
Canadian drag queens
Canadian make-up artists
Canadian non-binary people
Greek drag queens
Greek emigrants to Canada
Greek make-up artists
Greek non-binary people
Non-binary drag performers
People from Argos, Peloponnese